The women's high jump event at the 2008 World Junior Championships in Athletics was held in Bydgoszcz, Poland, at Zawisza Stadium on 8 and 10 July.

Medalists

Results

Final
10 July

Qualifications
8 July

Group A

Group B

Participation
According to an unofficial count, 33 athletes from 27 countries participated in the event.

References

High jump
High jump at the World Athletics U20 Championships
2008 in women's athletics